Ponsie Barclay Hillman, (1918-2008) was a pioneer in the civil rights and labor movement, and a member of many community organizations in New York City. She was a life member of the NAACP, continuously working at the Mid-Manhattan and New York branches and on the state and national level. In the summer of 1963, she was one of 53 teachers to assist in opening up the American Federation of Teachers’ Freedom Schools Project, in Prince Edward County, Virginia. Always a community activist, she also joined the North Manhattan Alumnae chapter of her sorority, Delta Sigma Theta, Inc., and the United Federation of Teachers. Hillman’s love for Harlem was evident by her work with the Deltas. She established the first Education Committee and served as its chair. For many years, on Saturdays, Hillman mentored girls, taking them to view exhibits at the Liberty Science Center and other cultural events in New Jersey and New York City.   On September 17, 2017, the northwest corner of Columbus Avenue and West 71st was renamed "Mrs. Ponsie B. Hillman Way".

References

1918 births
2008 deaths
NAACP activists
People from New York City
American civil rights activists